Santi Marcellino e Pietro al Laterano is a Roman catholic parish and titular church in Rome on the Via Merulana. It is dedicated to Saints Marcellinus and Peter, 4th century Roman martyrs, whose relics were brought here in 1256.

History
The first church on the site was built by Pope Siricius in the 4th century, close to the Via Labicana's catacombs of Marcellinus and Peter, with an adjoining hospice which became a centre for pilgrims.  This church was restored by Pope Gregory III in the 8th century. Ever since these early centuries, it has been among Rome's stational churches for the Saturday of the Second Week in Lent.  In the ninth century, the remains of Saints Marcellinus and Peter putatively were transferred from the catacombs here to a church in Seligenstadt, Germany. When the church was rebuilt in 1256 by Pope Alexander IV, the martyrs' relics were putatively returned. At Present, under the high altar is an urn containing relics of Saint Marcia.
On the left side is an altar dedicated to the Blessed Virgin, with a copy of Guido Reni's The Virgin in Glory with Angels, St Joseph and St Rita. Next to it is the Chapel of Reconciliation.  An image of the dedicatees was placed on the first column on the left from the entrance  during this restoration, with an inscription recording the  restoration.  The hospice and church were then given in 1276 to the Confraternity of those Commended to the Saviour.

The present church is the result of Pope Benedict XIV's 1751 reconstruction. The present cube-shaped exterior is divided by pilaster strips in a Neoclassical style, but with a late-Baroque elements, including a dome influenced by the architecture of Borromini. The façade was designed by Girolamo Theodoli and the main altarpiece by Gaetano Lapis depicts the dedicatees' martyrdom.  After that restoration, the church was awarded until 1906 for the worship of the Discalced Carmelites. A small chapel to Our Lady of Lourdes was dedicated at the south east, next to a chapel of St Gregory the Great, with a new ceiling painting of her by N. Caselli, in 1903.  Since 1911, it has been a parochial church served by diocesan clergy.

The church has a Greek cross plan.

This church is a titular church of Czech cardinal Dominik Jaroslav Duka, O. P.

References

External links
Chiesa di Santi Marcellino e Pietro al Laterano on gcatholic.org.

Bibliography

 Giacomo Laderchi, De sacris basilicis ss. martyrum Marcellini et Petri de urbe dissertation historica  (Roma: per F. Gonzagam, 1705).
 Giovanni Battista de Rossi, Escavazioni nel cimitero dei ss. Pietro e Marcellino sulla via Labicana (Roma: Tipi del Salviucci 1882) .

Marcellino
4th-century churches
Marcellino e Pietro